The Man Trap is a 1917 American silent crime drama film directed by Elmer Clifton and starring Herbert Rawlinson, Ruby Lafayette and Sally Starr.

Cast
 Herbert Rawlinson as John Mull
 Ruby Lafayette as Mrs. Mull
 Sally Starr as Bess Miller
 Jack Nelson as Burton Grange
 Mark Fenton as R.H. Steadman
 Frank MacQuarrie as Finch
 Hal Wilson as Trusty

References

Bibliography
James Robert Parish & Michael R. Pitts. Film directors: a guide to their American films. Scarecrow Press, 1974.

External links
 

1917 films
1917 crime films
1910s English-language films
American silent feature films
American crime films
American black-and-white films
Universal Pictures films
Films directed by Elmer Clifton
1910s American films